Mohammad Nurul Huda (5 April 1949- 25 January 2017) was a Bangladeshi politician. He was elected Member of Parliament from Chandpur-2 (Matlab North and South) constituency in the 2nd, 5th, 6th, and 8th general elections. He was a former Vice-Chairman of the central executive committee of the Bangladesh Nationalist Party and a member of BNP Chair person Khaleda Zia's advisory council. In 1991, he served as the Minister of State for Information and Establishment (now Public Administration) in Khaleda Zia's first cabinet.

Career
Md. Nurul Huda became involved in student politics while still in school. He was one of the main leaders of the Chhatra League at Comilla Victoria Government College in the mid-1960s. He did his MA in Economics from Dhaka University. In 1969, he was the convener of the Greater Comilla District Sarbadaliya Chatra Sangram Parisad (all-party student struggle council). During the War of Independence in 1971, he was appointed as deputy commander of the Greater Comilla District Bangladesh Liberation Force (BLF). In 1973, he joined as the first BCS cadre (admin) of independent Bangladesh. He left the government service and participated in the 2nd general election of Bangladesh held on 1 February 1979 and became a member of parliament as an independent candidate from the then Comilla-20 constituency at the age of 28. On April 4 of the same year (1979), he joined the Bangladesh Nationalist Party (BNP).

He was elected Member of Parliament from Chandpur-2 constituency in 1991, 1996, and 2001 as a Bangladesh Nationalist Party (BNP) candidate. For the first six months of 1991, he served as the Minister of State for Information and for the next two years, as the Minister of State for Establishment.

Death
Huda died on 25 January 2017 in New York City, United States. He left behind his wife, Khushi Akhter, and his two sons, Tanvir Huda and Sanvir Huda.

References

Bangladesh Nationalist Party politicians
2017 deaths
5th Jatiya Sangsad members
8th Jatiya Sangsad members
People from Matlab Uttar Upazila
1949 births